This is a list of Ice Road Truckers Season 7 episodes.

The focus of this season is the winter road network originating in Winnipeg.

Episodes

Returning drivers 
Debogorski, Kelly, and Ward relocate to Winnipeg this season and begin driving for Polar Industries. Rowland and Pleskot return as well, leaving Polar to start their own trucking company, VP Express.

New drivers 
Art Burke: Burke, a Yellowknife resident, has driven the diamond mine ice roads for 15 years. He originally signs on with VP Express to drive for Rowland but switches over to Polar, after being fired.  He also brings the winning load for Polar by the end of the season.
Todd Dewey: Dewey, a logging trucker from Washington state, started his first year on the ice road to work for Rowland. He is also featured in Ax Men season 8, especially driving logs for  Rygaard Logging into the saw mill during the warmer months. Dewey is the nephew of Craig Rygaard and cousin of Gabe, Jason, and Burt. Craig is the original owner of Rygaard Logging, and when he retired, Gabe took over.
Joey Barnes: Barnes, known as the "King of Obsolete", and his daughter Xena live in northern Manitoba, well past the end of the winter roads. He uses vintage trucks and modified tractors to travel over the rough terrain for equipment delivery/pickup runs.

Final load counts 
Polar – 181
VP – 180

References 

 
2013 American television seasons
Ice Road Truckers seasons